Lucas François Bernard Hernandez (born 14 February 1996) is a French professional footballer who plays as a left back or centre back for  club Bayern Munich and the France national team. Considered one of the best defenders in the world, Hernandez is known for his versatility and defensive prowess. 

Hernandez started his career with Atlético Madrid where he made more than 100 competitive appearances, reaching the 2016 UEFA Champions League Final. He also won the 2018 Europa League and the Super Cup in the same year. He signed for Bayern in 2019, winning the Bundesliga, DFB-Pokal, and Champions League in his first season as part of a treble. A French international since 2018, Hernandez was part of the winning squad at the 2018 FIFA World Cup and also participated in UEFA Euro 2020.

Club career

Atlético Madrid

Born in Marseille while his father Jean-François Hernandez was playing for Olympique de Marseille, Hernandez moved to Spain at age four (as a result, he would later speak French with a slight Spanish accent), and joined Atlético Madrid's youth setup in 2007 at age 11 from CF Rayo Majadahonda. On 9 November 2013, while still a junior, he was called up by manager Diego Simeone for a La Liga match against Villarreal CF, but remained unused in the 1–1 away draw on the following day.

Hernandez made his senior debut on 26 April 2014, starting for the reserves in a 0–1 away loss against Real Sociedad B in the Segunda División B. He appeared in three further matches during the season, as they narrowly avoided relegation; he also signed a new deal with the club in June, running until 2018.

Hernandez made his first-team debut on 3 December 2014, playing the full 90 minutes in a 3–0 away success over CE L'Hospitalet in the campaign's Copa del Rey. His maiden appearance in the Spanish top level took place on the 21st, when he came on as a late substitute for Guilherme Siqueira in a 4–1 away win against Athletic Bilbao.

2015–16 season
On 10 August 2015, Hernandez renewed his contract until 2019 and was definitively promoted to the main squad. His maiden appearance in the UEFA Champions League took place on 15 March 2016, as he replaced injured Diego Godín for extra time of the round-of-16 tie against PSV Eindhoven (0–0 after 120 minutes, 8–7 penalty shootout win); he entered at the same point in the final, a shootout loss to neighbours Real Madrid in the San Siro on 28 May.

2016–17 season
On 6 August 2016, Hernandez signed a contract extension with Atlético until 30 June 2020. He played a more important role for Atlético during the 2016-17 season. Hernandez played in 22 matches in all competitions during the season. He was in the starting lineup in 20 of these matches.

2017–18 season
During the 2017-18 season, Hernandez was a key member of the team as he played in 44 matches in all competitions. Atlético reached the 2018 UEFA Europa League Final. He started and played the whole match against French club Marseille. Atlético won the match 3-0 and Hernandez won his first international trophy.

2018–19 season
Hernandez scored his first goal as a professional on 19 January 2019, in a 3–0 away defeat of SD Huesca.

On 27 March 2019, Atlético confirmed that Hernandez would leave the club in the summer of 2019. Atlético confirmed they offered Hernandez a contract extension, but he decided to sign for Bundesliga club Bayern Munich. Atlético said that the German club activated Hernandez's release clause of €80 million. During the medical examination by Bayern Munich medical staff, a damage to the medial collateral ligament in Hernandez's right knee was found. The injury required a surgical repair. On 28 March 2019, Hernandez had a successful operation on his right knee. The operation ended Hernandez's season with Atlético.

Hernandez played in 14 La Liga matches and scored one goal. In all competitions, he played in 22 matches and scored one goal.

On 12 October 2019, Hernandez's former coach at Atlético, Diego Simeone, said in an interview with Marca that the left back's departure to Bayern had hurt Atlético a great deal: "The exit that hurt us the most was Lucas, who was a boy from the academy ... [It hurt] More than [Antoine] Griezmann," who left Atlético at the same time for Barcelona.

Bayern Munich
On 27 March 2019, Bayern Munich announced that Hernandez would join the club on 1 July 2019 for a club record (and Bundesliga record) fee of €80 million, signing a five-year contract lasting until 2024. He made his debut for Bayern on 10 August in a first round match against Energie Cottbus in the DFB-Pokal as an 89th-minute substitute. On 23 August 2020, along with his Bayern Munich teammates, Hernandez became a Champions League winner.

On 3 November 2020, Hernandez scored his first goal for Bayern Munich in a 6–2 away win over Red Bull Salzburg in the 2020–21 UEFA Champions League.

International career

Hernandez earned his first cap for France on 6 March 2012, playing the full 90 minutes for the under-16 team in 1–1 friendly draw against Italy at Coverciano. In 2014, he also appeared with the under-18 and under-19 sides. The following year, he was selected for 2015 UEFA European Under-19 Championship Team of the Tournament for his performances.

In March 2018, Hernandez was called up to the senior team by manager Didier Deschamps for friendlies with Colombia and Russia. He made his debut against the former, replacing Lucas Digne for the last 14 minutes of the 2–3 loss in Paris.

Hernandez was selected for the 2018 FIFA World Cup. He made his debut in the competition on 16 June, playing the entire 2–1 group stage win against Australia; he featured in all of the matches for the eventual champions, playing for the full 90 minutes in six of France's seven matches on their way to winning the tournament.

In October 2021, ahead of the UEFA Nations League semi-finals against Belgium, Lucas for the first time received a call-up to the national team from Didier Deschamps together with his brother Theo; the two were later fielded in the 3–4–1–2 formation as a left center back and a left wingback, respectively, making it the first time they played together in a senior competitive game, which turned out to be a 3–2 comeback victory for France, with Theo scoring the winning goal in the 90th minute. Hernandez was selected for France's squad ahead of the 2022 FIFA World Cup but suffered a ruptured anterior cruciate ligament (ACL) 13 minutes into the first group match against Australia and was subsequently ruled out for the remainder of the tournament. His younger brother Theo Hernandez substituted into the match for him after the injury and played out the remainder of France's World Cup 2022 run in his stead.

Personal life
Hernandez's father, Jean-François, was also a footballer who played as a centre back. Of Spanish descent, he also played for Atlético Madrid; Hernandez's younger brother, Theo, was also raised at the club, and played in the same position. In an interview with Marca in October 2018, he stated that his family had not heard from their father for 12 or 13 years. In 2022, French newspaper L'Équipe found that Jean-François – who went missing in 2004 – was living in Thailand, and had allegedly been legally blocked by his ex-partner from seeing their children.

On 3 February 2017, Hernandez was arrested on suspicion of assaulting his girlfriend, who was also summoned to appear in court. Both Hernandez and his girlfriend, Amelia Llorente, were sentenced to 31 days of community service, while Hernandez was also served with a restraining order preventing him from being within 500 metres of Llorente.

Hernandez was arrested again in June of the same year for violating the restraining order after he and Llorente landed together in Madrid, returning from their honeymoon. For this violation, on 13 October 2021, Hernandez was sentenced to six-months in prison by a Spanish court; Hernandez successfully appealed his sentence and was instead given a four year suspended sentence and ordered to pay a €96,000 fine.

Career statistics

Club

International

Honours
Atlético Madrid
UEFA Europa League: 2017–18
UEFA Super Cup: 2018
UEFA Champions League runner-up: 2015–16

Bayern Munich
 Bundesliga: 2019–20, 2020–21, 2021–22
 DFB-Pokal: 2019–20
 DFL-Supercup: 2020, 2022
 UEFA Champions League: 2019–20
 UEFA Super Cup: 2020
 FIFA Club World Cup: 2020

France
FIFA World Cup: 2018; runner-up: 2022
UEFA Nations League: 2020–21

Individual
UEFA European Under-19 Championship Team of the Tournament: 2015

Orders
Knight of the Legion of Honour: 2018

References

External links

Profile at the FC Bayern Munich website

 
 

1996 births
Living people
French people of Spanish descent
Footballers from Marseille
French footballers
Association football defenders
Atlético Madrid B players
Atlético Madrid footballers
FC Bayern Munich footballers
Segunda División B players
La Liga players
Bundesliga players
UEFA Champions League winning players
France youth international footballers
France under-21 international footballers
France international footballers
2018 FIFA World Cup players
UEFA Euro 2020 players
2022 FIFA World Cup players
French expatriate footballers
Expatriate footballers in Spain
French expatriate sportspeople in Spain
Expatriate footballers in Germany
French expatriate sportspeople in Germany
FIFA World Cup-winning players
UEFA Nations League-winning players
Chevaliers of the Légion d'honneur